The following elections occurred in the year 1880.

Europe
 1880 United Kingdom general election
 United Kingdom general election, 1880 (Ireland)

North America

United States
 1880 New York state election
 1880 South Carolina gubernatorial election
 1880 United States House of Representatives elections
 United States House of Representatives elections in California, 1880
 United States House of Representatives elections in South Carolina, 1880
 1880 United States presidential election
 1880 and 1881 United States Senate elections

South America
 1880 Argentine presidential election

See also
 :Category:1880 elections

1880
Elections